Robin Jonathan Hugh Lett (born 23 December 1986 in Westminster, London) is an English cricketer who played for Somerset and OUCCE. He is a right-handed batsman and occasional right-arm bowler. He was educated at Millfield School and Oxford Brookes University.

After consistent performances in the Somerset Second XI in 2005 and 2006 he made his first-class debut against Glamorgan in late 2006 making exactly 50.  In August 2010, Somerset's Director of Cricket, Brian Rose announced that Lett's contract would not be renewed for the 2011 season.

References

External links
 

1986 births
Living people
English cricketers
Somerset cricketers
People educated at Millfield
Alumni of Oxford Brookes University
Oxford MCCU cricketers
Unicorns cricketers
People from Westminster
English cricketers of the 21st century